Bogidiellidae is a family of amphipod crustaceans, containing the following genera:

Actogidiella Stock, 1981
Aequigidiella Botosaneanu & Stock, 1989
Afridiella Karaman & Barnard, 1979
Antillogidiella Stock, 1981
Arganogidiella Koenemann & Holsigner, 1999
Argentinogidiella Koenemann & Holsigner, 1999
Aurobogidiella Karaman, 1988
Bermudagidiella Koenemann & Hosinger, 1999
Bogidiella Hertzog, 1933
Bogidomma Bradbury & Williams, 1996
Bollegidia Ruffo, 1974
Cabogidiella Stock & Vonk, 1992
Dycticogidiella Grosso & Claps, 1985
Eobogidiella G. Karaman, 1982
Fidelidiella Jaume, Gràcia & Boxshall, 2007
Grossogidiella Koenemann & Holsinger, 1999
Guagidiella Stock, 1981
Hebraegidiella G. Karaman, 1988
Indogidiella Koenemann & Holsigner, 1999
Maghrebidiella Diviacco & Ruffo, 1985
Marigidiella Stock, 1981
Marinobogidiella Karaman, 1981
Medigidiella Stock, 1981
Megagidiella Koenemann & Holsinger, 1999
Mesochthongidiella Grosso & Fernandez, 1985
Mexigidiella Stock, 1981
Nubigidiella G. Karaman, 1988
Omangidiella Iannilli, Holsinger, Ruffo & Vonk, 2006
Orchestigidiella Stock, 1981
Parabogidiella Holsinger in Holsinger & Longley, 1980
Patagongidiella Grosso & Fernández, 1993
Racovella Jaume, Gràcia & Boxshall, 2007
Stockigidiella Iannilli, Holsinger, Ruffo & Vonk, 2006
Stygogidiella Stock, 1981
Xystriogidiella Stock, 1984

References

Gammaridea
Crustacean families